Blaney is a small village and townland in County Fermanagh, Northern Ireland. It is situated within Fermanagh and Omagh district.

History 
The area takes its name from the Irish word "Bléan" which means a creek. The suggestion that it derives from the Blayneys of Castleblayney originates in an inaccurate statement in Livingstone's History of Fermanagh. Blaney Bay, on Lough Erne was a good location for prospective settlers.

Places of interest 

One of the children of the 5th Duke was Gerald Grosvenor, 6th Duke of Westminster whose home was here until he went to boarding schools in England. It is now a private residence.

Sport 

Castle Hume Golf Club has an 18th-century dovecote in its grounds.

Public transport
Ulsterbus route 99, Belleek - Enniskillen serves Blaney infrequently - once a day each way Mondays to Fridays. Bus Éireann Expressway route 30 passes through Blaney but does not stop.

See also 
 List of towns and villages in Northern Ireland

References

External links

Villages in County Fermanagh
Fermanagh and Omagh district